Joseph Melton Campbell (born October 6, 1952) is an American politician from Georgia. Campbell is a Republican member of Georgia House of Representatives for District 171.

References

Republican Party members of the Georgia House of Representatives
21st-century American politicians
Living people
1952 births